Vernon DuBois Penner Jr. (born October 20, 1939) is a retired United States diplomat.  He served as Ambassador to Cape Verde (1986–1990), as well as tours in Frankfurt, Warsaw, Oporto, Zurich, and Kobe-Osaka. As Deputy Assistant Secretary of State, he was Director of the Visa Office in the State Department in Washington in 1983.

While ambassador in Cape Verde, he assisted with archeological discoveries relating to "17th-century Hebraic tombs and early 19th century grave markers of deceased US Navy seamen."

From 1997 to 2001, he was Deputy Commandant of the NATO Defense College in Rome, Italy.  He speaks German, Polish, and Portuguese.

Personal life
Penner is the son of Vernon DuBois Penner (1905-1987) and his wife, Edna Anna Johanna Burhenn (1903-1999). His parents are buried in New Paltz Rural Cemetery in New Paltz, New York, a location founded by Penner's ancestors. Penner descends from eight of the twelve Patentees, or founders, of New Paltz, including Louis DuBois (Huguenot).

On July 6, 1963, in Smithtown, New York, Penner married Dorothy Anne Skripak (born May 2, 1942); together they have two children, Alexandra Suzanne and Robert DuBois Penner.

References

External links
 

1939 births
Living people
Ambassadors of the United States to Cape Verde
Deep Springs College alumni
United States Foreign Service personnel